Pashtun culture is based on Pashtunwali, as well as speaking of the Pashto language and wearing Pashtun dress. 

Pashtunwali and Islam are the two main factors which make the baseline for  the social behavior in Pashtun society. Pashtuns are traditionally strict and conservative regarding the preservation of their culture.

Pashtunwali as a social code of honor 
Being the worlds largest tribal ethnicity, Pashtun society is guarded by a code of common rules, customs and social behaviors, known collectively as Pashtunwali. The code is based on personal honor and promotes courage, self-respect, independence, leadership, justice and hospitality.

Traditional dress and clothing

Headwear and turbans 
One of the trademark and historical headwear of Pashtuns is an adorned turban wrapped tightly around a hat with one of its ends loose over the shoulders, a sure sign and recognition of a Pashtun. the turban itself has been a symbol of pride and the center of many Pashto proverbs. However, it should be mentioned that different tribes have different types of turbans unique to them, as such tribal styles have been persevered for centuries. They are worn in everyday life by elders, adults and tribal leaders as sign of status and respect. The common turban comes in a spectrum of colors with unique striped patterns. These styles are uniquely associated with Pashtuns throughout Central and South Asia. However, other Afghan ethnic groups have also however adopted the Pashtun turban style.

Another common headwear of Pashtuns is the Pakol hat, which is a soft rolled up flat wool hat, that is worn on the head and worn like a beret. It comes in a variety of earthly colors and is used to keep the head warm, although this isn't a traditional headwear and was adopted in the 19th century, it is worn by many of them today in everyday life.

Women's clothing 
Traditionally modest, Pashtun women when in public, or when visiting cities or in the presence of men, have observed the Burka, a garment worn by some Muslim women around the world. They cover themselves with burka from head to toe, whilst leaving latticed slits, or nets to see through. It is made from cotton and comes in a variety of colors such as blue, white, brown and black. The burka is an essential part of Pashtun culture as it conveys honor and respect to others, in society, however it is not worn by children, young girls or elderly women. It may be worn in all Pashtun regions from Afghanistan and Pakistan, as well as by some diaspora women. However, in the presence of their own family members it may be taken off. The burka has historically been associated with women of higher class and suggested women didn't need to work. Many women insist upon wearing it to preserve their self respect and honor

Contrary to the false beliefs and propaganda suggesting it was introduced by Taliban, the earliest recorded mention of Pashtun women wearing the burka was in the early 18th century, by a British soldier of the British Empire, James Rattray records that:When out of doors, or taking Horse exercise, these ladies don an immense white sheet, reaching from the top of the skull cap, to the feet, a long square veil, attached by a clasp of gold, or jewel to the back of the head, conceals the face, across where there is an opening of network to admit light and air. This dress is called a Boorkha. It conceals the whole figure, all outlines which is so entirely lost, that a stranger, on viewing a party of these shrouded beings flitting about him on the streets, might as well be at a loss to guess to what class of creatures they belonged. In addition to the winding sheets, they wear long loose white boots of calico, fastened by a silken garter above the knees and turned back like a falling collar, in order to display the lining. The soles of these baglike leggings are of shawl and the garters, in their glittering tissues bear emblazed holy memorials, acts of zeal, and love recorded eminents from - from the Quran, the loose boots and veils are also embraided in white and coloured silk. They sit aside on horse back generally behind their own husband or one of their own sexWomen wear long, colorful traditional clothing similar to the Khet Partoog. The color of the dress is usually red and is covered with variety of other ornaments. They adorn themselves in various traditional jewelry such as ornamental headpieces, bracelets, nose rings, earrings, necklaces are also worn. Henna is also done of the fingers, feet and hands to beautify themselves

Tattoos 
Amongst the Ghilji tribes of Pashtuns, an ancient tradition exists, the Sheen Khaal, which is regarded as a sign of beauty for women. Sheen Khaal, being a tribal custom, are geometric blue markings which are marked on the chin, cheeks, mid-brow, and forehead of young Pashtun women. It was once quite common amongst the Ghilji Pashtun women. However, nowadays it is often seen on elder ladies or nomads normally referred to as Kochi. This practice is slowly being abandoned due to the influence of Islam which forbids tattoos and this is also because most of the nomadic Ghilji tribes have slowly have become more settled. Despite this many elderly ladies still have it as well as a few younger ones in Southern Afghanistan. As a substitute many women now use Sheen Khaal temporarily with henna, on special occasions (e.g., weddings). Different sub-tribes of the Ghilji tribe have different patterns. 

This same Sheen Khaal culture or facial tattoos on women is also coincidently found thousand of miles away, in many Middle Eastern cultures, like the Kurds and Berbers/Amazigh of North Africa.

Jirga and Hujra

Jirga (tribal council) 
Within both Afghanistan and Pakistan, one of the oldest recorded traditions of Pashtun society is Jirgas, or tribal councils. It is an assembly of respected elders and chieftains, get together in a circle and make decisions for the tribe. The Jirgas or tribal councils pass laws, resolves conflicts, deal with the government, murder cases, rewards fines and death sentences, declare war and peace, and banish people from the tribe.

Foreign powers, such as the British Empire, attended Jirgas during the 18th and 19th century, in order to maintain relationships with the tribes and settle any conflicts. Today, both Afghan and Pakistani  

There is no hierarchy in Jirgas, no president or spokesmen's; with respect to the elders, all the participants are equal, all can participate and speak, no one has authority over another. It has been described as "the closest thing to Athenian democracy that has existed since the original".

Hujra 
Hujras are guest houses for men, used to entertain. They act as a community club that is as old as the Jirga itself. Every village has a hujra and is occasionally owned by a wealthy family but is shared by the entire community. Male members of the community who linger and associate like a larger family commonly visit the hujra which serves as more than just a place to hold collective ceremonies.

A man can enter a Hujra at any time of the day, month or year and be sure of getting safety, food and shelter. It is only after he has been adequately fed that the members ask him how they can help him and assure him that he can stay as long as he wishes.

Cultural dance

Attan 

Amongst Pashtuns, a part of their traditional pre-Islamic culture is the Attan, a war dance. Historically, Pashtuns  the Attan just before or after a successful raid or tribal war, used to instill confidence before a battle and spiritually be ready, however today its usually done more specifically for celebrations such as weddings - some still do it before a tribal war.

Historically said to be linked with Zoroastrianism, It is a circular dance ranging from two to over a hundred people, and the performers will follow each other going round and round in a circle to the beat as the rhythm and beats faster. It is typically performed in a circle of tribesmen, around a drummer beating a double-headed barrel drum, the rhythm of the speed of the Attan is based on the rhythm of the drum. The dance, which is intensive, usually lasts up to 30 minutes, and is finished until exhaustion of all the performers. 

There are various types of Attan in the Pashtun belt of Afghanistan and Pakistan, they differ in motions, and even accessories. The differences are unique to the different tribes such as, Khattak, Wazir, Mehsud, Kochi, Zadran, Zazai, Wardaki, Mangal and more.

Cuisine 
Pashtun cuisine is characterized by their own traditional dishes as well as some influence by outsiders. Rice dishes and kebabs feature prominently in Pashtun cuisine. Lamb is eaten more often in their cuisine than any other culture in the region, Kabuli palaw, Chappli Kebab, Mutton, are the most famous dishes.

Holidays and celebrations 
Eid (Islamic Holiday)

Nowruz

Independence day of Afghanistan (19 August),

It is not uncommon for Pashtuns to start firing guns shots joyously into the air during on hearing a special event or celebration. Celebrations include weddings, birth of a child, or the end of Ramadan.

See also 
Pashtun people
Pashtun tribes
Pashtunistan

References